The Spanish ironclad Méndez Núñez was a wooden-hulled armored corvette converted from the 38-gun, steam-powered frigate Resolución during the 1860s after the ship was badly damaged during the Chincha Islands War of 1864–1866. She was captured by rebels during the Cantonal Revolution in 1873 and participated in the Battle off Cartagena before she was returned to government control after Cartagena surrendered in early 1874. The ship was stricken from the Navy List in 1886 and broken up ten years later.

Description as an ironclad
The ship displaced . She had a single compound-expansion steam engine that drove her propeller using steam provided by four boilers. For long-distance travel, Méndez Núñez was fitted with three masts and ship rigged. She carried  of coal.

The ship was armed with four Armstrong  and two  rifled muzzle-loading guns. The ship was a central-battery ironclad with the armament concentrated amidships.

Construction and career
Resolución was laid down on 22 September 1859 by the Reales Astilleros de Esteiro in Ferrol and launched on 19 September 1861. Completed on 28 April 1862, the ship played a major role in the Chincha Islands War. Resolución participated in various military operations such as the blockade of the Chilean coast (Action of 17 November 1865), the Bombardment of Valparaíso and the Battle of Callao. She was badly damaged during the war and was rebuilt into an armored corvette in 1867–1870. Completed in February 1870, the ship was renamed Méndez Núñez, after Admiral Casto Méndez Núñez, on 21 August 1870. The ship was assigned to the Mediterranean Squadron after completion.

In mid-1873, the First Spanish Republic was beset with the Cantonal Revolution while fighting the Third Carlist War. The revolutionaries seized Cartagena on 12 July while the bulk of the Mediterranean Squadron was in port. The German and British ironclads  and  seized Vitoria and a wooden steam frigate as pirates after they threatened to bombard Almeria unless a ransom was paid and later turned them over the national government on 26 September. On 8 August, Méndez Núñez ran aground whilst attempting to recapture Numancia and Vitoria. Numancia and Méndez Núñez later attacked coastal fortifications defending Alicante and were lightly damaged. On 11 October, all three Cantonist ironclads, Numancia, Tetuan, and Méndez Núñez were at sea when they were attacked near Cartagena by a small government fleet led by Vitoria. Reluctant to actually sink the rebel ships, the government ships kept their distance and thwarted rebel attempt to close with them. The latter suffered 13 dead and 49 wounded in the skirmish. On 13 October, Méndez Nuñez was reported to have run aground whilst leaving Cartagena in company with Numancia and Tetuan. She was refloated. The government blockaded Cartagena on 23 October and the city surrendered on 12–13 January 1874.

Méndez Núñez was stricken in 1886 and scrapped in 1896.

Footnotes

References

External links
La Marina Blindada en el Siglo XIX

1861 ships
Ships built in Spain
Ironclad warships of the Spanish Navy
Chincha Islands War
Maritime incidents in August 1873
Maritime incidents in October 1873